Dry Jack is an American jazz fusion band, active originally during the 1970s and the 1980s. Dry Jack formed in 1973 by founder keyboardist Chuck Lamb and his bassist brother Rich. Drummer Jon Margolis joined a year later and guitarist Rod Fleeman in 1977. Dry Jack was cited in Rolling Stone's History of Music as “one of the premier, cutting edge bands of the electric jazz movement.” They followed on the heels of Larry Coryell's The Eleventh House, Chick Corea's Return to Forever, and Weather Report. Dry Jack shared the stage with many musical greats, including Ray Charles, Pat Metheny, Freddie Hubbard, and McCoy Tyner. Chuck Lamb described the inspiration for the band's name as coming from a patron, who after listening to the music declared, "That's really dry, jack."

The band released two albums: Magical Elements and Whale City through the Inner City Records label.

Regular band members were Chuck Lamb on piano and his brother Rich Lamb on bass guitar. Other band members included Evan DuChene and Jon Margolis on drums; John Lamb, Rocco Marshall, Clint Swank, Tony DePaolo and Rod Fleeman on guitar. Theano Anifantakis was featured on vocals in the 1980s.

In 2016, the band reunioned and started to record a third album, called alien intervention. Band members include Chuck and Rich Lamb, Jon Margolis, and Rod Fleeman.

Discography

Studio albums

Live performances

The excitement behind Dry Jack is the energy of their gigs and the faithful fans surrounding the events at venues in New York, Colorado, Kansas City, and Rapid City, SD.

See also
Yacht rock

References

External links

 2015 Reunion concert in Colorado at YouTube

American jazz ensembles from New York (state)
Jazz fusion ensembles